Monroe Township is one of the fourteen townships of Perry County, Ohio, United States.  The 2000 census found 1,565 people in the township, 926 of whom lived in the unincorporated portions of the township.

Communities
Corning is a village located at  within the northern portion of the township.
Rendville is a village located at  within the northern portion of the township. The population was 36 at the 2010 census, making it the smallest incorporated community in Ohio.

Geography
Located in the southeastern corner of the county, it borders the following townships:
Bearfield Township - north
Deerfield Township, Morgan County - northeast corner
Union Township, Morgan County - east
Homer Township, Morgan County - southeast corner
Trimble Township, Athens County - south
Coal Township - southwest
Salt Lick Township - west
Pleasant Township - northwest

Name and history
Monroe Township was organized in 1823, and named for President James Monroe. It is one of twenty-two Monroe Townships statewide.

Government
The township is governed by a three-member board of trustees, who are elected in November of odd-numbered years to a four-year term beginning on the following January 1. Two are elected in the year after the presidential election and one is elected in the year before it. There is also an elected township fiscal officer, who serves a four-year term beginning on April 1 of the year after the election, which is held in November of the year before the presidential election. Vacancies in the fiscal officership or on the board of trustees are filled by the remaining trustees.

References

External links
County website

Townships in Perry County, Ohio
Townships in Ohio
1823 establishments in Ohio
Populated places established in 1823